This was the first edition of the tournament.

Dušan Lajović won the title after defeating Steven Diez 6–1, 6–4 in the final.

Seeds

Draw

Finals

Top half

Bottom half

References

External links
Main draw
Qualifying draw

Maspalomas Challenger - 1